Come Dance with Me! is an album by vocalist Frank Sinatra, released in 1959.

Come Dance with Me! was Sinatra's most successful album, spending two and a half years on the Billboard charts. Stereo Review wrote in 1959 that "Sinatra swaggers his way with effortless verve through an appealing collection of bouncy standards, aptly described in the album notes as 'vocals that dance'".

At the Grammy Awards of 1960, Come Dance with Me! won the Grammy Award for Album of the Year, as well as Grammy Award for Best Vocal Performance, Male. Billy May won the Grammy Award for Best Arrangement.

Come Dance With Me stayed on Billboard's Pop album chart for 141 weeks, peaking at #2 for four weeks. The album remained in the top ten for 58 weeks, spending 29 weeks in the top ten in 1959 and another 29 weeks in the top ten in 1960.

CD releases 
In 1987, Capitol released Come Dance with Me! on compact disc with four extra songs not found on the original LP. The album was again remastered in 1998 for the "Entertainer of the Century" series of Sinatra reissues. This version includes the same four bonus tracks found on the 1987 release.

Track listing 
 "Come Dance with Me" (Sammy Cahn, Jimmy Van Heusen) – 2:31
 "Something's Gotta Give" (Johnny Mercer) – 2:38
 "Just in Time" (Jule Styne, Betty Comden, Adolph Green) – 2:24
 "Dancing in the Dark" (Arthur Schwartz, Howard Dietz) – 2:26
 "Too Close for Comfort" (Jerry Bock, Larry Holofcener, George Weiss) – 2:34
 "I Could Have Danced All Night" (Alan Jay Lerner, Frederick Loewe) – 2:40
 "Saturday Night (Is the Loneliest Night of the Week)" (Cahn, Styne) – 1:54
 "Day In, Day Out" (Rube Bloom, Mercer) – 3:25
 "Cheek to Cheek" (Irving Berlin) – 3:06
 "Baubles, Bangles & Beads" (Robert Wright, George Forrest) – 2:46
 "The Song Is You" (Jerome Kern, Oscar Hammerstein II) – 2:43
 "The Last Dance" (Cahn, Van Heusen) – 2:11
 CD reissue bonus tracks not included on the original 1959 release:
 "It All Depends on You" (B.G. DeSylva, Lew Brown, Ray Henderson) – 2:06
 "Nothing in Common" (duet with Keely Smith) (Cahn, Van Heusen) – 2:32
 "Same Old Song and Dance" (Cahn, Van Heusen, Bobby Worth) – 2:52
 "How Are Ya' Fixed for Love?" (duet with Keely Smith) (Cahn, Van Heusen) – 2:25

Personnel 
 Frank Sinatra - vocals
 Keely Smith - vocals (On "Nothing in Common" and "How Are Ya' Fixed for Love?" CD bonus tracks)
 Billy May - arranger, conductor
 Heinie Beau - arranger

Tracks 1, 5, 6, 12:

Mannie Klein, Shorty Sherock, Conrad Gozzo, Frank Beach, Joe Triscari (tpt); Ed Kusby, William Schaefer, Joe Howard, Si Zentner (tbn); Willie Schwartz, Buddy Collette, Babe Russin, Bill Ulyate, Chuck Gentry (sax/wwd); Bill Miller (p); Allan Reuss (g); Mike Rubin (b); Irving Cottler (d). Heinie Beau, Billy May (arr).

Tracks 2, 3, 11:

Shorty Sherock, Conrad Gozzo, Mannie Klein, Frank Beach (tpt); Milt Bernhart, Si Zentner, Tommy Pederson, Murray McEachem (tbn); Skeets Herfurt, Buddy Collette, Babe Russin, Fred Falensby, Justin Gordon (sax/wwd); Bill Miller (p); Al Hendrickson (g); Joe Comfort (b); Shelly Manne (d).

Tracks 4, 7, 8, 9, 10:

Shorty Sherock, Conrad Gozzo, Mannie Klein, Pete Candoli (tpt); Ed Kusby, Si Zentner, Tommy Pederson, Murray McEachem (tbn); Skeets Herfurt, Buddy Collette, Babe Russin, Fred Falensby, Bill Ulyate (sax/wwd); Bill Miller (p); Al Hendrickson (g); Keith Mitchell (b); Irving Cottler (d). Heinie Beau, Billy May (arr).

Track 13:

Conrad Gozzo, Mickey Mangano, Robert Guy, Pete Candoli (tpt); Joe Howard, Tommy Pederson, Milt Bernhart, Ed Kusby (tbn); Red Callender (tuba); Willie Schwartz, Phil Sobel, Jules Jacob, Chuck Gentry, Buddy Collette (sax/wwd); Verlye Mills (harp); Bill Miller (p); Al Hendrickson (g); Ralph Pena (b); Alvin Stoller (d); Frank Flynn, Milt Holland (perc).

Tracks 14, 15, 16:

Conrad Gozzo, Frank Beach, Johnny Best, Harry Edison (tpt); Tommy Pederson, Ed Kusby, William Schaefer, Dick Noel (tbn); Willie Smith, Skeets Herfurt, Babe Russin, Fred Falensby, Joe Koch (sax/wwd); Bill Miller (p); Al Hendrickson (g); Joe Mondragon (b); Alvin Stoller (d).

Certifications

References 

1959 albums
Frank Sinatra albums
Capitol Records albums
Grammy Award for Album of the Year
Grammy Award for Best Male Pop Vocal Performance
Albums produced by Dave Cavanaugh
Albums arranged by Billy May
Albums conducted by Billy May
Albums arranged by Heinie Beau
Albums recorded at Capitol Studios